Courtney John Lock (born 18 October 1996) is a Zimbabwean tennis player.

Lock has a career high ATP singles ranking of 1,227 achieved on 9 December 2019. He also has a career high ATP doubles ranking of 303 achieved on 28 October 2019.

Lock represents Zimbabwe at the Davis Cup. He won his first Davis Cup match in a 2015 Davis Cup tie against Moldova. He also participates in doubles alongside his brother Benjamin Lock. Lock has won ten doubles titles on the ITF professional circuit. Lock received his education at the University of Nevada, Las Vegas (USA).

Future and Challenger finals

Doubles: 28 (16–12)

Davis Cup

Participations: (4–5)

   indicates the outcome of the Davis Cup match followed by the score, date, place of event, the zonal classification and its phase, and the court surface.

References

External links

1996 births
Living people
Zimbabwean male tennis players
White Zimbabwean sportspeople
Sportspeople from Harare
Competitors at the 2019 African Games
African Games competitors for Zimbabwe